Ashan Dias (Sinhala: අෂාන් ඩයස්; born 31 May 1981) is an actor in Sri Lankan cinema. Started as a newscaster in MBC Networks, Dias turned to be a character actor with several critically acclaimed roles in films such as Alimankada, Sarigama and Vijayaba Kollaya.

He hosted two seasons of television reality program Thathvika telecast on TV Derana.

Personal life
He was born on 31 May 1981 to a Roman Catholic family. He studied at Maris Stella College, Negombo. He completed A/L education from mathematics stream. He has two brothers.

Career
After A/Ls, he worked with an architect friend for six months. While studying at the Institute of Architecture, he started to work part time as a reporter in MTV/MBC network. He started as a reporter for MTV, doing coverage, news writing and editing. After five months as a news reporter, Dias got into news reading for Yes FM and then later for MTV. He worked in News reading for Yes FM on Tuesday evenings and for MTV on Monday and Friday nights.

During the time as a TV presenter, Dias started backstage in a couple of Workshop Players' plays. He also acted as a "hyena" in theater play Lion King. His maiden cinematic experience came through 2008 film Alimankada directed by Chandran Rutnam. His role as "Captain Wasantha Ratnayake" was highly praised by the critics. In 2016, he acted in the film Siri Parakum. For his role as "Pathiraja Senevi", he won the Hiru Golden Film award for the Best Supporting actor.

In 2019, he co-hosted the Derana Lux Film Festival with fellow actor Jagath Manuwarna. In 2020, he hosted the adventure cookery program Cookout on TV Derana. In 2020, he acted in the Sci-Fi horror film Vikaari directed by Sandun Seneviratne and British Filmmaker Charlie Bray.

Filmography

References

External links
 The Road from Elephant Pass
 විජයබා කොල්ලයට දින 75 ක්

Sri Lankan male film actors
Sinhalese male actors
Living people
1981 births